This is a list of software for creating, performing, learning, analyzing, researching, broadcasting and editing music. This article only includes software, not services. For streaming services such as iHeartRadio, Pandora, Prime Music, and Spotify, see Comparison of on-demand streaming music services. For storage, uploading, downloading and streaming of music via the cloud, see Comparison of online music lockers. This list does not include discontinued historic or legacy software, with the exception of trackers that are still supported. For example, the company Ars Nova produces music education software, and its software program Practica Musica has remnants of the historic Palestrina software. Practica will be listed here, but not Palestrina. If a program fits several categories, such as a comprehensive digital audio workstation or a foundation programming language (e.g. Pure Data), listing is limited to its top three categories.

Types of music software

CD ripping software 

 Brasero
 CDex
 Exact Audio Copy
 fre:ac
 k3b

Choir and learn-to-sing software 
 This section includes both choir software and learn-to-sing software. For music learning software, see music education software.

 Cantor (music software)
 SingingCoach

DJ software 

 Cross/CrossDJ
 Deckadance
 djay
 Final Scratch
 Mixxx
 Serato
 Traktor
 Rekordbox
 VirtualDJ

Digital audio workstation (DAW) software 

Ableton Live
ACID Pro
Ampedstudio
Ardour
Audacity
Audiotool
Bitwig Studio
Cakewalk by BandLab
Cubase
Digital Performer
FL Studio
GarageBand
LMMS
Logic Pro
Maschine
MetaSynth
Mixcraft
Nuendo
Mixbus
MuLab
Orion Studio
Pro Tools
Qtractor
REAPER
Renoise
Rosegarden
Samplitude
Sonic Pi
Soundtrap 
Studio One
Waveform
Zynewave Podium
Zrythm

Computer music software 

 Bol Processor
 ChucK
 Csound
 Director Musices
 List of Generative music software
 JFugue
 Kyma (sound design language)
 Keykit
 Max/MSP
 Pure Data
 Real-time_Cmix
 SuperCollider

Internet, RSS, broadcast music software 

This section only includes software, not services. For services programs like Spotify, Pandora, Prime Music, etc. see Comparison of on-demand streaming music services. Likewise, list includes music RSS apps, widgets and software, but for a list of actual feeds, see Comparison of feed aggregators. For music broadcast software lists in the cloud, see Content delivery network and Comparison of online music lockers.

 Airtime
 Audicom (First radio automation software—see Radio software)
 Campcaster
 Clickradio
 Juice (aggregator)
 Jamulus (Internet jamming software)
 Moodagent (AI based emotion keyed playlist generator and app)
 Ninjam (Internet jamming software)
 OpenBroadcaster
 Panopto
 RapidFeeds

Lyrics and vocals 

 Cantor (music software)
 Rhyme Genie (Algorithms and software for rhyming lyrics)
 SingingCoach

MIDI plug-ins 

 Bitcrusher
 Chorus effect
 Delay (audio effect)
 Dither
 Jamstix
 Liquid Rhythm
 MachFive (MOTU Mark of the Unicorn)
 MCDSP (Metropolis Group)
 Midijet pro
 Native Instruments's B4, Electrik Piano, Guitar Rig 2
 OrangeVocoder (Prosoniq)
 Producer Factory Pro Bundle (DigiDesign via Avid Audio)
SoundFont (Integrates synthesized/sampled MIDI files with recorded music)
 Symphonic Instrument (MOTU Mark of the Unicorn)
 TL Space Native Edition (Trillium Labs dist. by DigiDesign via Avid Audio)

Music analysis software 

 BeatRoot
 BRP-PACU
 ChucK
 Kyma (sound design language)
 Pure Data (This software also is used in embedded form for real time algorithmic music generation in Spore (2008 video game))
 Platinum Blue Music Intelligence (from Music Xray company)
 Praat
 Sonic Visualiser
 WaveSurfer

Music circuit software 

 Arduinome (software circuit platform)
 CPU Sim
 Electric VLSI Design System
 gLogic
 GNU Circuit Analysis Package
 KTechLab
 Linear Technology (a/d, circuit software, and others.)
 List of free electronics circuit simulators
 LTspice
 Micro-Cap
 MIDIbox (software circuit platform)
 Monome (software circuit platform)
 Ngspice
 Oregano (software)
 Quite Universal Circuit Simulator
 SapWin
 SPICE
 Tenori-on (software circuit platform)

Music composing software 

 Antescofo
 Director Musices
 Hyperscore
 JFugue
 Keykit
 Kyma (sound design language)
 Magix Music Maker
 Max
 Music Mouse (Algorithmic synth and composer)
 Nodal
 Ocarina
 OpenMusic
 PetSynth
 Progression
 Reaktor (Software creation of nearly every instrument; reverse engineering encouraged)
 Rubato Composer (First composition software based on Category theory)

Music conversion software 

 AIMP
 Audacity
 Brasero
 CDex
 Exact Audio Copy
 FFmpeg
 FL Studio
 foobar2000
 FormatFactory
 Freemake Audio Converter
 Free Studio
 fre:ac
 iTunes
 k3b
 MediaCoder
 MediaHuman Audio Converter
 MediaMonkey
 SoX 
 VLC Media Player
 Winamp
 WMA Convert
 XMedia Recode

Music education software 

 Soundtrap
 Meludia (ear-training practice exercises)
 EarMaster
 GNU Solfege (ear-training practice exercises)
 Reaktor (software creation of nearly every instrument; reverse engineering encouraged)
 Rocksmith (video game with emphasis on instructional aspects; unique in that controller can be any electric guitar w/ 1/4" jack)
 Synthesia (video game with piano instruction aspects)
 WaveSurfer (studies of acoustic phonetics)
 Yousician (educational game to learn to play guitar and piano)

Music gaming software 

 Beat Saber
 Crypt of the NecroDancer
 osu!
 Music Tech
 Rocksmith (Video game with some instructional aspects; unique in that controller can be almost any electric guitar)

Music mathematics software 

 JFugue, an API for music programming that is designed to support generative and algorithmic music
 Julia (programming language) (MIT freeware, new, high-level dynamic programming language competing with R (programming language), MATLAB and GNU Octave.)
 Scala, a program for creating and analysing musical scales
 Wolfram Language provides built-in functionality for audio generation, as well signal processing, audio signal processing and MIDI.

Music notation software 

 Aegis Sonix
 Canorus
 Capella
 Deluxe Music Construction Set
 Denemo
 Dorico
 Encore
 ENT (for typeset mensural notation)
 Finale
 Forte
 Frescobaldi
 Gregorio (for Neumes)
 Guitar Pro
 Igor Engraver
 Impro-Visor
 jEdit plugin
 LilyPond
 MagicScore
 Mozart
 Mus2
 MusEdit
 MuseScore
 Music Write
 MusiCAD
 MusicEase
 Musink
 MusiXTeX
 NoteEdit
 Noteflight
 Notation Composer
 NoteWorthy Composer
 NOTION
 Overture (Includes VST hosting as well as being a scorewriter)
 Philip's Music Writer (PMW)
 Power Tab Editor
 Progression
 Rosegarden
 SCORE
 ScoreCloud
 Sibelius (Division of Avid Technology since 8/2006. Avid also sells the Pro Tools DAW)
 SmartScore (Focus on Music OCR)
 TuxGuitar

Music player software

Music research software 

 ScoreCloud (Notation research)

Music technology, synthesis and o/s software 

 :Category:Music software plugin architectures
 Comparison of audio synthesis environments
 DirectMusic
 Moodagent (AI based emotion keyed playlist generator and app)
 Music information retrieval
 Software effect processor
 Sound Recorder (Windows)
 Impromptu (programming environment)
 Keykit
 Max (software)
 SynthFont (a MIDI to WAV converter-- Virtual Studio Technology instruments can be used instead of source files)

Music visualization software 

 Advanced Visualization Studio (Justin Frankel) (platform: Windows)
 Cthugha (1993, Kevin "Zaph" Burfitt) (platform: DOS)
 Magic Music Visuals (since 2012, Color & Music, LLC) (platforms: Windows, OS X)
 MilkDrop (2001-2012, Ryan Geiss) reimplemented as projectM (platforms: Windows, Linux, Android)
 Neon (2004, Jeff Minter and Ivan Zorzin) (platform: Xbox 360)
 Psychedelia, (1984, Jeff Minter), an early "light synthesizer",  did not use audio input but was designed to create visualizations in accompaniment to music.
 Pure Data (e.g. visualization of incoming music signals)
 Virtual Light Machine (1990, Jeff Minter) (platform: Atari Jaguar)
 Visual Music Tone Painter (1992–2004)

Orchestration software 

 Antescofo
 IRCAM
 OpenMusic
 Orchidée

Drums and percussion 
 Liquid Rhythm
 Radiodrum

Guitar 
 Guitar Rig 
 Progression (software)

Piano 

 Kurzweil Digital Piano
 Pianoteq (Modartt)
 SGX-1 Premium Piano
 Synthesia
 Virtual piano

Pipe organ 
 Hauptwerk produces audio in response to MIDI signal from attached keyboard or from a MIDI sequencer

Automatic composition software 

Experiments in Musical Intelligence

Samplers and sequencers 

 Electribe
 Music sequencer (Article includes extensive list)
 Propellerhead
 SoundFont (Integrates synthesized/sampled MIDI files with recorded music)

Soundtrack creation software 

 Anvil Studio
 Ensoniq PARIS
 FL Studio
 FL Studio Mobile
 Mixcraft
 Pro Tools
 Sound Forge
 Soundtrap 
 SpectraLayers
 WaveLab

Trackers 

Historical tracker software:
Ultimate Soundtracker (Amiga, 1987)
NoiseTracker (Amiga, 1989)
OctaMED (Amiga, 1989)
ScreamTracker (PC, 1994) 
FastTracker 2 (PC, 1994) 
Impulse Tracker (PC, 1995)

Virtual Studio Technology hosting software

 Ableton Live
 ACID Pro
 Adobe Audition
 Adobe Premiere Elements
 Adobe Premiere Pro
 Acoustica Mixcraft
 Ardour (open source)
 Audacity (open source, Windows, Linux and Mac platforms only)
 AudioMulch
 Band-in-a-Box
 Bidule
 Cakewalk by BandLab
 Deckadance
 Digital Performer (version 8 or higher)
 FL Studio
 GoldWave
 Jeskola Buzz
 LMMS (open source)
 Logic Pro
 Max MSP
 ModPlug Tracker
 MultitrackStudio
 n-Track Studio
 NOTION
 REAPER
 Reason
 Renoise
 Samplitude
 Sony Acid Pro
 Sony Sound Forge 
 Sony Vegas 
 Soundtrap 
 Steinberg Cubase
 Steinberg Nuendo
 Studio One
 Steinberg Wavelab
 Traktor
 Vocaloid
 WavePad Audio Editor
 Podium
 Zrythm ((copy left, open source)

Virtual synthesizer and studio software 

 Amsynth
 Minimoog
 Reaktor (software creation of instrument)
 Reason (DAW and virtual recording studio, integrated with Record)
 ZynAddSubFX

Wave editors 

 Audition
 Audacity
 Goldwave
 Sound Forge
 WavePad Audio Editor

See also

 Audio editing software
 Comparison of audio synthesis environments
 Comparison of digital audio editors
 Comparison of free software for audio
 Comparison of MIDI editors and sequencers
 Comparison of scorewriters
 List of audio conversion software
 List of audio programming languages
 List of guitar tablature software
 List of Linux audio software
 List of scorewriters
 Music technology

References 

 
DJing
Lists of software
MIDI
Software